Tawny may refer to:
 Tawny (given name), a feminine given name
 Tawny (color)
 Tawny port, a fortified wine
 Tawny, a 1954 record album by Jackie Gleason
 Tawny, a townland in Kilcar, County Donegal, Ireland

See also
 Tenné, a "stain" used in heraldry
 Mister Tawky Tawny, a fictional character in the Marvel Family comics
 Tawny Man, a fantasy book trilogy by Robin Hobb
 Tawney, surname